"A Feelin' Like That" is a song written by Ira Dean, David Lee Murphy, and Kim Tribble, and recorded by American country music artist Gary Allan.  It was released in October 2006 as the only single from his first Greatest Hits compilation album. It peaked at number 12 on the U.S. country chart, and at number 71 on the Hot 100.

Critical reception
Brody Vercher of Engine 145 called "A Feelin' Like That", "a quintessential Gary Allan song about 'a guy who has done it all and seen it all' but can’t find anything that gives him the same feeling as a former love that he left behind.

Chart positions
"A Feelin' Like That" debuted at number 54 on the U.S. Billboard Hot Country Singles & Tracks for the week of November 4, 2006.

Year-end charts

References

2006 singles
2006 songs
Gary Allan songs
Songs written by David Lee Murphy
MCA Nashville Records singles
Song recordings produced by Mark Wright (record producer)
Songs written by Kim Tribble
MCA Records singles